The manuscript designated Ashmolean Parchment AN 1981.940 contains a Coptic male homosexual love spell written in Hermopolitan dialect, which is held and preserved at the Ashmolean Museum in Oxford, England.

Description 
This vellum leaf was obtained by the British Egyptologist Francis Llewellyn Griffith from an Egyptian  named Fanous. It dates back to 6th or 7th century, and measures 10.5 cm wide and 8 cm high. The creases in the manuscript show that it was originally folded to 2.5 × 1.3 cm. Its provenance is unknown, but the dialect suggests somewhere in middle Egypt, perhaps Hermopolis and its surrounding areas.

The text is an incantation by a man named Apapolo (Papapōlō), the son of Nooe (Noah), to compel the love of another man Phello (Phlo), the son of Maure. Phello will be restless until he finds Apapolo and satisfies the latter's desire. The text provides the only example in Coptic language of a love spell between men.

The English translation from the Kyprianos Database of Ancient Ritual Texts and Objects of the University of Würzburg:

See also 
 Coptic literature
 Homosexuality in ancient Egypt
 LGBT history in Egypt
 Greek Magical Papyri

References 

Incantation
Texts in Coptic
Egyptian manuscripts
6th-century manuscripts
7th-century manuscripts
Collection of the Ashmolean Museum
Gay history